Pilea cavernicola is a herbaceous plant about 0.5 meters tall, native to China. A sciophyte, it grows in very low light conditions in caves in Fengshan County, Guangxi, China.

References

cavernicola
Cave organisms